Statistics of the Scottish Football League in season 1921–22.

Scottish League Division One

Scottish League Division Two

See also
1921–22 in Scottish football

References

 
Scottish Football League seasons